Jim or James Cronin may refer to:

 Jim Cronin (zookeeper) (1951–2007), founder of Monkey World, Dorset, England, a sanctuary for abused and neglected primates
 Jim Cronin (baseball) (1905–1983), American Major League Baseball infielder
 Jim Cronin (soccer) (1906–1942), American soccer player
 James Cronin (1931–2016), American particle physicist
 James Cronin (rugby union) (born 1990), Irish rugby union player
 James Cronin, founder of the Ceroc dance club